Elections were held in the Regional Municipality of Durham of Ontario on October 27, 2014 in conjunction with municipal elections across the province.

It marked the first time Durham residents will be electing their regional chair, after voting for the right to do so in a plebiscite held in 2010.

Durham Regional Council

Durham Regional Chair
The following are the official results for the position of the Durham Regional Chair.

Ajax

Brock

Clarington
The following are the results for the Municipality of Clarington. There was a voter turn-out of 30.53%.

Mayor

Regional Councillors
Two Regional Councillors were elected in 1 of 2 wards.

Local Councillors
Four Local Councillors were elected in 1 of 4 wards.

Oshawa

Pickering

Scugog

Uxbridge

Whitby

References 
Results 

Durham
Politics of the Regional Municipality of Durham